is a train station of West Japan Railway Company (JR-West) in Kashihara, Nara, Japan. Although the station is on the Sakurai Line as rail infrastructure, it has been served by the Man-yō Mahoroba Line since 2010 in terms of passenger train services.

Lines
  JR-West
  Man-yō Mahoroba Line

Layout

Platforms

External links
 Official website 

Railway stations in Japan opened in 1913
Railway stations in Nara Prefecture